Kenneth Roberts (2 October 1937 – 8 August 2017) was an English rugby union and professional rugby league footballer who played in the 1950s, 1960s and 1970s. Ken was one of a rare breed of forwards with an ability to dominate games with sheer physical power and incredible ball-handling skills. At 6' 1" and over sixteen stones Ken was a towering figure, quick runner and a damaging defender who always took the game to the opposition. He was an intimidating scrummager, inspiring pack leader and a player to be feared, respected and admired.

Background
Ken Roberts was born in Atherton, Lancashire, England, and he died aged 79.

Playing career

International honours
Ken Roberts won caps for Great Britain whilst at Halifax, in 1963, against Australia where his début helped secure a 16–5 victory. He was also capped in 1964 against France (2 matches), in 1965 against France, and New Zealand (3 matches), and in 1966 against France, and New Zealand (2 matches). In 1966, he also toured Australasia with Great Britain, playing in 19 matches including both Test matches against New Zealand, scoring 4 tries and captaining the touring side against Central Queensland, Newcastle, Southern New South Wales, Northern Division and Monaro. Ken was a committee member of the British Rugby League Lions Association

County honours
Ken Roberts won 5 caps for Lancashire throughout his career against Yorkshire, Cumberland and New Zealand.

Combined Salford-Swinton – 1 appearance

County Cup Final appearances
Ken Roberts played left-, i.e. number 11, in Swinton's 9–15 defeat by St. Helens in the 1960 Lancashire County Cup Final during the 1960–61 season at Central Park, Wigan on Saturday 29 October 1960, played left- in the 9–25 defeat by St. Helens in the 1961 Lancashire County Cup Final during the 1961–62 season at Central Park, Wigan on Saturday 11 November 1961, and played left-, i.e. number 8, in the 4–7 defeat by St. Helens in the 1962 Lancashire County Cup Final during the 1962–63 season at Central Park, Wigan on Saturday 27 October 1962.

Championship final appearances
Ken Roberts played in Halifax's 15–7 victory over St. Helens in the 1964–65 Championship Final during the 1964–65 season at Station Road, Swinton on Saturday 22 May 1965.

Club career
Ken Roberts made his début for Swinton on 10 March 1956, scoring a try and a goal from the second-row in a 25–7 victory at Blackpool Borough. He would go on to amass 128 points throughout his seven-year spell at the club. In 1960, 1961 and 1962 he played in three consecutive Lancashire Cup Finals for Swinton and was a member of their Lancashire County League winning team during the 1960–61 season. Ken won the Championship with Swinton during the 1962–63 season, and on 23 April 1963, played his 202nd and last game for Swinton, a 17–4 victory over Oldham at Watersheddings, Oldham.

In 1963, Ken was transferred across the Pennines, for a huge £5,000 (based on increases in average earnings, this would be approximately £240,900 in 2014), to Halifax where, on 24 August, he made his début at Thrum Hall, Halifax against Featherstone Rovers. The same year, Halifax would win the Yorkshire Cup, beating Featherstone Rovers in the Final. 1964 saw Ken elected as vice-captain at Halifax, then soon after, captain. He was also a member of the team which beat Castleford 20–12 at Fartown to win the Eastern Division Championship that same year. Ken's leadership of a magnificent pack of forwards was a major factor in Halifax's charge towards the Rugby League Championship in 1965. It was their dominance which allowed Halifax to overcome St. Helens 15-7 and Ken had a momentous season himself, making 39 appearances. The following season saw Halifax lose to St Helens in a repeat Championship Final at Swinton, and saw Ken make another incredible 36 appearances, including the fixture against New Zealand. On 27 January 1967, Ken played his last game for Halifax, against Leeds at Headingley.

The following week he walked out at Odsal in the Challenge Cup for Bradford Northern against Featherstone Rovers. Ken would play a total of 39 matches for Bradford before making his début for a victorious Rochdale Hornets, against York, including a try, on 17 August 1968.

In October 1969, Ken moved to his last club, Salford and he made his début on 29 October with a victory over St. Helens, at the Willows. Ken played his 475th and last first-class game on 20 October 1970 for Salford against Widnes in the BBC2 Floodlit Trophy.

Honoured at Halifax
Ken Roberts made 27 appearances for Great Britain, 10 in Test matches, and the only player to have captained a Great Britain XIII. Ken Roberts is a Halifax Hall of Fame Inductee.

References

"A Record of Ken Roberts" Robert Gate 1990

External links
!Great Britain Statistics at englandrl.co.uk (statistics currently missing due to not having appeared for both Great Britain, and England)
Photograph "A flying tackle" at rlhp.co.uk
Photograph "Ken Roberts covers" at rlhp.co.uk
Photograph "A tired looking Ken Roberts" at rlhp.co.uk
Photograph "Ken Roberts pulled down" at rlhp.co.uk
Photograph "Roberts on the charge" at rlhp.co.uk

1937 births
2017 deaths
Bradford Bulls players
English rugby league players
Great Britain national rugby league team players
Halifax R.L.F.C. coaches
Halifax R.L.F.C. players
Lancashire rugby league team players
People from Atherton, Greater Manchester
Place of death missing
Rochdale Hornets players
Rugby league players from Wigan
Rugby league props
Rugby league second-rows
Salford Red Devils players
Swinton Lions players